The 2020–21 season was Győri Audi ETO KC's 41st competitive and consecutive season in the Nemzeti Bajnokság I and 73rd year in existence as a handball club.

Players

Squad information

Goalkeepers
1  Laura Glauser
 12  Amandine Leynaud 
 16  Silje Solberg
Left wingers
 13  Anita Görbicz (c)
 14  Brigitta Csekő
 23  Csenge Fodor 
 57  Szidónia Puhalák 
Right wingers
 22  Viktória Lukács
 48  Dorottya Faluvégi
Line players 
2  Béatrice Edwige 
7  Kari Brattset Dale 

Left backs
4  Eszter Ogonovszky
8  Anne Mette Hansen
 18  Eduarda Amorim Taleska 
 21  Veronica Kristiansen 
Centre backs
 15  Stine Bredal Oftedal 
 27  Estelle Nze Minko
Right backs
5  Laura Kürthi

Transfers

 In
  Laura Glauser (GK) (from  Metz Handball)
  Silje Solberg (GK) (from  Siófok KC)
  Viktória Lukács (RW) (from  Ferencvárosi TC)

 Out
 Kari Aalvik Grimsbø (GK) (retired)
 Éva Kiss (GK) (retires)  Bernadett Bódi (RW) (to  Moyra-Budaörs Handball) Jana Knedlíková (RW) (to  Vipers Kristiansand) Katarina Bulatovic (RB) (retired)
 Amanda Kurtović (RB) (with immediate effect on loan to  Kastamonu)

Club

Technical Staff

Source: Coaches, Management

Uniform
Supplier:  Adidas
Main sponsor: Audi / tippmix / OTP Bank / City of Győr 
Back sponsor: PannErgy / Győrszol
Shorts sponsor: OMV / Leier / OIL!

Competitions

Overview

Nemzeti Bajnokság I

League table

Results by round

Matches

Results overview

Hungarian Cup

Round 5

Semi-final

Final

EHF Champions League

Group stage

Matches

Results overview

Knockout stage

Play-offs

Quarter-finals

Semi-final

Bronze-match

Statistics

Top scorers
Includes all competitive matches. The list is sorted by shirt number when total goals are equal.EHF Champions League – Top scorers of Győri Audi ETO KCLast updated on 4 June 2021''

 * Player left the team during the season.

Attendances

List of the home matches:

Notes

References

External links
 
 Győri Audi ETO KC at eurohandball.com

 
Győri ETO